The 2001 NCAA Division I Men's Golf Championships were contested at the 63rd annual NCAA-sanctioned golf tournament for determining the individual and team national champions of men's collegiate golf at the Division I level in the United States.

The tournament was held at the Duke University Golf Club in Durham, North Carolina.

Florida won the team championship, the Gators' fourth NCAA title and first since 1993.

Nick Gilliam, also from Florida, won the individual title.

Qualifying
The NCAA held three regional qualifying tournaments, with the top ten teams from each event qualifying for the national championship.

Individual results

Individual champion
 Nick Gilliam, Florida (276)

Team results

Finalists

Eliminated after 36 holes

DC = Defending champions
Debut appearance

References

NCAA Men's Golf Championship
Golf in North Carolina
NCAA Golf Championship
NCAA Golf Championship
NCAA Golf Championship